Ilse Schwidetzky (married name Rösing, 6 September 1907, in Lissa – 18 March  1997, in Mainz) was a German anthropologist.

Biography 
She was the daughter of Georg and Susanne Schwidetzky. Susanne Schwidetzky, who studied math at the University of Berlin around 1900, died in 1911 of tuberculosis. Georg Schwidetzky studied law and had a successful political career which ended with World War I.  The family moved to Leipzig, where Georg Schwidetzky worked for Die Deutsche Bücherei, roughly equivalent to the Library of Congress.  Ilse Schwidetzky had three siblings, Eva (born in 1905, died 1958), Walter (born in 1910, died in 1996), and Georg (a half-brother born in 1917, died in 2003).  She is related to Oscar Schwidetzky, who invented the ace bandage and was the first non-MD admitted to the American Medical Association (common relative, Leopold Schwidetzky, her great-grandfather).

Ilse Schwidetzky studied history, biology and anthropology in Leipzig and Breslau. 
From the 1930s, she worked as the assistant of  Egon Freiherr von Eickstedt, one of the leading racial theorists of Nazi Germany. Schwidetzky married Bernhard Rösing in 1940, also a professor.  They lived in different cities.  Then and now it is not uncommon for two-professor couples in Germany to live apart given how few positions there are for professors. The couple had three children, among them ethnologist  Ina Rösing  and anthropologist  Friedrich Wilhelm Rösing.  Bernhard Rösing was killed in a train accident in 1944. The train carried an army reserve unit of which Bernhard Rösing was a member. The unit was tasked with conducting clean up operations. It was a "regular" train accident and not caused by any military action. Bernhard Rösing was the only member of Ilse Schwidetzky's closer family who died during World War II.  All of her children, her siblings and her father survived the war.

Schwidetzky worked at the newly founded Anthropological Institute at Mainz University from 1946, succeeding Eickstedt as Mainz Professor of Anthropology in 1961 until her retirement in 1975.  She published under her maiden name, not her married name.

Awards and recognition
Ilse Schwidetzky was member or honorary member in numerous academic associations:
Permanent Council der International Union of Anthropological and Ethnological Sciences (1974 vice president)
Akademie der Wissenschaften und der Literatur, Mainz
Société d’Anthropologie de Paris
Anthropologische Gesellschaft, Vienna
Société Royale Belge d’Anthropologie 
Sociedade de Geografia de Lisboa
Sociedad Española de Antropologia Biologica
Akademie für Bevölkerungswissenschaft Hamburg
Herder-Forschungsrat, Marburg
Deutsche Gesellschaft für Anthropologie und Humangenetik (chair 1968–1970)
honorary doctorate of the University of Crete (1990)

Bibliography 

Rassenkunde der Altslawen. Stuttgart 1938
Grundzüge der Völkerbiologie. Stuttgart 1950  
Das Problem des Völkertodes. Eine Studie zur historischen Bevölkerungsbiologie. Enke, Stuttgart 1954
Das Menschenbild der Biologie Ergebnisse und Probleme der naturwissenschaftlichen Anthropologie. G. Fischer, Stuttgart 1959 (2nd ed. 1970) 
Die vorspanische Bevölkerung der Kanarischen Inseln. Göttingen 1963  
with Hubert Walter: Untersuchungen zur anthropologischen Gliederung Westfalens. Münster 1967
Hauptprobleme der Anthropologie. Bevölkerungsbiologie und Evolution des Menschen. Rombach, Freiburg i.Br. 1971
Grundlagen der Rassensystematik. BI, Mannheim 1974
Rassen und Rassenbildung beim Menschen. Fischer, Stuttgart 1979
with I. Spiegel-Rösing: Maus und Schlange. Untersuchungen zur Lage der deutschen Anthropologie. Oldenbourg, München 1992

Literature 
 Wilhelm Emil Mühlmann: Ilse Schwidetzky zum 65. Geburtstag. In: Homo. 23, 1972,  298–303.  
 Wolfram Bernhard, Rainer Knußmann, Friedrich W. Rösing: Ilse Schwidetzky 6.9.1907–18.3.1997. In: Homo. 48, 1997, S. 205–212. 
 Wolfram Bernhard: Nachruf auf Ilse Schwidetzky-Rösing (1907–1997). In: Mitteilungen der Anthropologischen Gesellschaft in Wien. 128, 1998, 179–181.
 AG gegen Rassekunde (Hrsg.): Deine Knochen – deine Wirklichkeit. Texte gegen rassistische und sexistische Kontinuität in der Humanbiologie. Hamburg, Münster 1998.
 Veronika Lipphardt: Das „schwarze Schaf“ der Biowissenschaften. Marginalisierungen und Rehabilitierungen der Rassenbiologie im 20. Jahrhundert. In: Dirk Rupnow (Hrsg.): Pseudowissenschaft. Konzeptionen von Nichtwissenschaftlichkeit in der Wissenschaftsgeschichte. Frankfurt am Main 2008, .

External links
 Rassenkunde der Altslawen (1938) by Ilse Schwidetzky at the Internet Archive

References

1907 births
1997 deaths
People from Leszno
German anthropologists
German women anthropologists
People from the Province of Posen
20th-century anthropologists